Miss Grand Chile 2022 was the fourth edition of the Miss Grand Chile pageant, held on May 28, 2022, at the Criss Chacana Model Agency, Iquique. Ten contestants, either chosen by local licensees or national online casting, competed for the title, of whom Karina Pérez Gres of Las Condes was named the winner. She then represented Chile at the Miss Grand International 2022 pageant held on October 25 in Indonesia, but got a non-placement.

Results

Contestants
10 contestants competed for the title.

References

External links

 

Miss Grand Chile
Chilean awards
Grand Chile